Udea rubigalis, the celery leaftier or greenhouse leaftier, is a member of the family Crambidae. It is found across the Americas. The species was first described by Achille Guenée in 1854.

The larvae are polyphagous and feed on a wide variety of plants from different plant families. Preferred host plants are:

 Calendula officinalis (Asteraceae)
 Chrysanthemum × morifolium and Chrysanthemum frutescens (Asteraceae)
 Senecio cruentus (Asteraceae)
 Dianthus caryophyllus (Caryophyllaceae)
 Lathyrus odoratus (Fabaceae)
 Pelargonium hortorum (Geraniaceae)
 Antirrhinum species (Plantaginaceae)
 Rosa species (Rosaceae)
 Viola tricolor (Violaceae)

The larvae have also been recorded to be less injuriously feeding on:

 Justicia furcata (Acanthaceae)
 Ruellia amoena (Acanthaceae)
 Ageratum houstonianum (Asteraceae)
 Callistephus chinensis (Asteraceae)
 Cheiranthus sp. (Brassicaceae)
 Cnicus benedictus (Asteraceae)
 Dahlia rosea (Asteraceae)
 Matricaria parthenoides (Asteraceae)
 Senecio mikanioides (Asteraceae)
 Tagetes species (Asteraceae)
 Impatiens walleriana (Balsaminaceae)
 Begonia species (Begoniaceae)
 Heliotropium peruvianum (Boraginaceae)
 Lobelia erinus (Campanulaceae)
 Canna indica (Cannaceae)
 Tradescantia fluminensis (Commelinaceae)
 Ipomoea aculeata (Convolvulaceae)
 Azalea species (Ericaceae)
 Cytisus canariensis (Fabaceae)
 Swainsona galegifolia (Fabaceae)
 Kohleria inaequalis var. ocellata (Gesneriaceae)
 Deutzia gracilis (Hydrangeaceae)
 Coleus blumei (Lamiaceae)
 Nepeta hederacea (Lamiaceae)
 Salvia officinalis (Lamiaceae)
 Abutilon species (Malvaceae)
 Fuchsia speciosa (Onagraceae)
 Passiflora caerulea (Passifloraceae)
 Linaria cymbalaria (Plantaginaceae)
 Veronica species (Plantaginaceae)
 Plumbago capensis (Plumbaginaceae)
 Cyclamen persicum (Primulaceae)
 Primula species (Primulaceae)
 Anemone japonica (Ranunculaceae)
 Petunia hybrida (Solanaceae)
 Tropaeolum species (Tropaeolaceae)
 Lantana camara (Verbenaceae)

References

rubigalis
Moths of Central America
Moths of North America
Moths of South America
Moths described in 1854
Taxa named by Achille Guenée